Clairemont Drive station is an at-grade San Diego Trolley station in San Diego, California. The station platform is located on the westside of Morena Boulevard where the tracks are, while the parking structure will be built across the street on the eastside of Morena between Ingulf Street and Clairemont Drive. Service began on November 21, 2021 after the completion of the Blue Line Mid-Coast Trolley extension project.

Station layout 
There are two tracks, each served by a side platform.

References 

Blue Line (San Diego Trolley)
San Diego Trolley stations in San Diego
Railway stations in the United States opened in 2021